Elections to Ballymoney Borough Council were held on 30 May 1973 on the same day as the other Northern Irish local government elections. The election used three district electoral areas to elect a total of 16 councillors.

Election results

Districts summary

|- class="unsortable" align="centre"
!rowspan=2 align="left"|Ward
! % 
!Cllrs
! % 
!Cllrs
! %
!Cllrs
! %
!Cllrs
! %
!Cllrs
!rowspan=2|TotalCllrs
|- class="unsortable" align="center"
!colspan=2 bgcolor="" | UUP
!colspan=2 bgcolor="" | SDLP
!colspan=2 bgcolor="" | DUP
!colspan=2 bgcolor="" | Alliance
!colspan=2 bgcolor="white"| Others
|-
|align="left"|Area A
|17.1
|1
|0.0
|0
|34.2
|1
|0.0
|0
|bgcolor="#DDDDDD"|48.7
|bgcolor="#DDDDDD"|2
|4
|-
|align="left"|Area B
|bgcolor="40BFF5"|35.9
|bgcolor="40BFF5"|3
|19.3
|2
|0.0
|0
|3.9
|0
|40.9
|3
|8
|-
|align="left"|Area C
|1.7
|0
|0.0
|0
|0.0
|0
|20.1
|1
|bgcolor="#DDDDDD"|78.2
|bgcolor="#DDDDDD"|3
|4
|-
|- class="unsortable" class="sortbottom" style="background:#C9C9C9"
|align="left"| Total
|33.3
|4
|9.3
|2
|7.8
|1
|7.7
|1
|41.9
|8
|16
|-
|}

Districts results

Area A

1973: 1 x DUP, 1 x UUP, 1 x Independent Unionist, 1 x Independent

Area B

1973: 3 x UUP, 2 x SDLP, 2 x Independent Unionist, 1 x Independent Nationalist

Area C

1973: 2 x Independent, 1 x Alliance, 1 x Independent Unionist

References

Ballymoney Borough Council elections
Ballymoney